The 2014 USL Premier Development League season was the 20th season of the PDL. The regular season began on May 3 and ended July 20. The regular season was followed by a postseason tournament of conference winners to determine the league's champion. Seven teams were added to the league, bringing the total number of teams in the league to 64 for 2014. The Austin Aztex were the defending champions.

Changes from 2013

New teams 
Seven new clubs joined the PDL in 2014.

Name Changes 
Fort Lauderdale Schulz Academy became Floridians FC.
West Texas Sockers became Midland/Odessa Sockers.
NJ-LUSO Rangers FC became NJ-LUSO Parma.
North Sound SeaWolves became Puget Sound Gunners FC.
OC Blues Strikers FC became OC Pateadores Blues

Folding/moving 
Central Jersey Spartans - Folded
El Paso Patriots - Folded
Kansas City Brass - Folded
Oklahoma City FC - Withdrew - joined NPSL, new team to play in the 2015 NASL
Ottawa Fury - Folded, new Ottawa Fury FC team plays in the NASL
VSI Tampa Bay FC - Folded
Virginia Beach Piranhas - Folded
Chicago Inferno - Folded mid-season

Divisions
The schedule and divisions were announced January 31 with each team to play a 14-game schedule. The Western Conference was split into three divisions (Northwest, Southwest and Mountain).

Standings
2014 Premier Development League standings.

Note: The first tie-breaker in PDL standings is head-to-head results between teams tied on points, which is why some teams with inferior goal differences finish ahead in the standings.

Central Conference

Great Lakes Division

Heartland Division 
<onlyinclude>

Eastern Conference

Mid Atlantic Division

Northeast Division

South Atlantic Division

Southern Conference

Mid South Division

Southeast Division

Western Conference

Mountain Division

Northwest Division

Southwest Division

Conference Championships
Participants in the four conference championships were determined according to the specific rules of each conference.  In the two-division Central and Southern Conferences, the top two teams from each division meet in a conference final four.  In the Eastern and Western Conferences, both of which are broken into three divisions, additional quarterfinal matches were required.  In the Western Conference, two teams from the Northwest Division advanced to the conference final four: the division champion and the winner of a match between the division's second- and third-place teams.  The first-place teams from the Mountain and Southwest divisions met the second-place teams of the other division to determine the final two participants.  In the Eastern Conference the winner of a match between the Northeast and Mid-Atlantic divisions' second-place teams advanced to the final four along with the three division champions.

Eastern Conference Championship

Central Conference Championship

Southern Conference Championship

Western Conference Championship

Playoff Bracket

PDL Championship

Semi-finals

Championship

Championship MVP: Adam Grinwis, (MIB)

Awards
 Most Valuable Player: Dzenan Catic, (MIB)
 Young (U21) Player of the Year: Ricardo Velazco (TUC)
 Coach of the Year: Michael Jeffries, (DMM)
 Goalkeeper of the Year: Billy Thompson, (TUC)

All-League and All-Conference Teams

Eastern Conference
F: Anthony Grant (SUP) *, Jeff McClure (CIN), Alencar Junior (WMA)
M: Boluwatife Akinyode (NJL), Shaun Foster (LIR), Walter Hines (JER)
D: Kouassi Sylvain N’Guessan (JER), Jake Stovall (CIN), Tom Wharf (LIR), Travis Brent (WVA)
G: Alex Bono (REA)

Central Conference
F: Chris Hellmann (DMM) *, Moses Danto (WSA), Dzenan Catic (MIB) *
M: Zach Steinberger (MIB) *, Drew Conner (CHI), Ralph Lundy (DMM)
D: Nolan Intermoia (THU) *, Ken Tribbett (MIB), Blake Jones (STL), Dan Keller (CHI)
G: Yuta Nomura (SPR)

Western Conference
F: Javier Castro (LAM), Cody Cook (VAN), Kharlton Belmar (POR)
M: Ricardo Velazco (TUC) *, Jose Cuevas (FRE) *, Bryan de la Fuente (LAM)
D: Ramon Martin Del Campo (SJO) *, James Kiffe (VEN), Cory Keitz (KIT) *, Jordan Farahani (VAN)
G: Billy Thompson (TUC) *

Southern Conference
F: Jesus Cortes (AUS), Ilija Ilić (OCA), Adi Kavara (PAN)
M: Tony Rocha (AUS), Michael Lightbourne (PAN), Karamba Janneh (OCA)
D: Yair Hernandez (LAR) *, Walker Hume (MIO), Ben Knight (OCA), Kalen Ryden (AUS)
G: Devin Cook (AUS)

* denotes All-League player

References 

USL League Two seasons